Murosternum pulchellum is a species of beetle in the family Cerambycidae. It was described by Dalman in 1817, originally under the genus Lamia. It is known from the Ivory Coast, Liberia, Sierra Leone, Nigeria, Ghana, the Democratic Republic of the Congo, and Togo. It contains the varietas Murosternum pulchellum var. dalmanni.

Subspecies
 Murosternum pulchellum pulchellum (Dalman, 1817)
 Murosternum pulchellum viridescens Breuning, 1970

References

Tragocephalini
Beetles described in 1817